Yannick Bury (born 11 March 1990 in Herbolzheim) is an economist and a German politician for the CDU and has been a member of the Bundestag, the German federal diet since 2021.

Life
Bury was born in 1990 in the West German town of Herbolzheim and grew up in Broggingen and Malterdingen. From 2000 to 2006 he attended the Emil-Dörle-Realschule and in 2009 he graduated from the Wirtschaftsgymnasium Emmendingen. He completed his civilian service at the Caritas workshop in Riegel. Following that, Bury studied economics at the University of Freiburg in Freiburg where he graduated with a Master of Science in economics.
Since 2017, he has been working as an economist and research consultant at the Walter Eucken Institut in Freiburg.

Bury is of Protestant denomination, married and father of a son.

Politics
In 2006, Bury joined the Junge Union. From 2009 to 2016 he was district chairman of the Junge Union Emmendingen and from 2016 to 2019 district chairman of the Junge Union Südbaden. Since 2019, Bury has been district chairman of the Emmendingen CDU district association and chairman of the International Commission of the Junge Union of Germany.

In the 2021 German federal election, Bury ran as a direct candidate for the CDU in the Emmendingen – Lahr federal electoral district. He won the direct mandate with 27.8% of the first votes against the  SPD candidate Johannes Fechner. He is a deputy member of the Budget Committee and the Finance Committee. He is a full member of the Petitions Committee.

References

External links
 Biography at the German Bundestag

Living people
1990 births
Christian Democratic Union of Germany politicians
Members of the Bundestag 2021–2025
21st-century German politicians
People from Emmendingen (district)
University of Freiburg alumni
Members of the Bundestag for Baden-Württemberg